Flevans is a British musician.

References

External links 
 Official website 
 Tru Thoughts Official website 

Living people
British electronic musicians
1978 births